Arkansas Highway 113 (AR 113 and Hwy. 113) is a north–south state highway that runs in Central Arkansas. The route runs  from Arkansas Highway 10 to Morrilton. This also gives access to some rural areas west of Morrilton. It runs through Pulaski, Perry, and Conway counties. It contains no spur of business routes.

Route description
AR 113 begins near Lake Maumelle west of Little Rock. It runs north  to Wye where AR 300 forms a concurrency. AR 113 continues heading north and heads through Bigelow, Arkansas and then joins with AR 60 west to Houston.

In Houston, AR 113 departs AR 60 and heads north again to where it meets AR 9 south of the Arkansas River.  It crosses the Arkansas River into Morrilton. There, it joins US 64 for a short time then departs west to run on its own course parallel to that highway.  It joins back up with US 64 near Blackwell.

History
Arkansas Highway 113 was designated as part of the original 1926 state highways a route from Leola to Poyen. By 1928, a second segment was created from AR 10 to Bigelow and this segment was labeled 'impassable'. Between 1943 and 1945, the highway was extended to Morrilton. In 1957, the segment from Leola to Poyen was renumbered to AR 229. The segment along US 64 was added in 1963.

Major intersections

|-
|align=center colspan=5|  concurrency west, 
|-

|-
|align=center colspan=5|  and  concurrency north, 
|-

See also

 List of state highways in Arkansas

References

External links

113
Transportation in Pulaski County, Arkansas
Transportation in Perry County, Arkansas
Transportation in Conway County, Arkansas
Morrilton, Arkansas